Bonnie Annie Laurie is a 1918 American silent drama film directed by Harry F. Millarde and starring Peggy Hyland, Henry Hallam, William Bailey, Sidney Mason, and Marion Singer. The film was released by Fox Film Corporation on September 1, 1918.

Cast
Peggy Hyland as Annie Laurie
Henry Hallam as Sandy Laurie
William Bailey as Captain Donald McGrego
Sidney Mason as Andy McGregor
Marion Singer as Nan, the Nurse

Preservation
The film is now considered lost.

References

External links

1918 drama films
Silent American drama films
1918 films
American silent feature films
American black-and-white films
Fox Film films
Lost American films
1918 lost films
Lost drama films
Films directed by Harry F. Millarde
1910s American films